Mister Tinker in Oz is an apocryphal Oz book, authored by James Howe and published in 1985 by Random House involving an inventor responsible for Tik-Tok the Clockwork man and Dorothy and their adventure in Oz.

Plot summary
One night in Kansas, Dorothy meets Ezra P. Tinker, the inventor of Tik-Tok the clockwork man, and he tells her the thousand year guarantee has just run down. With the help of Mister Tinker's speckoscope and Julius Quickscissors they return to Oz. They encounter a group of babies called the Widdlebits and trek across the bottomless swamp. Finally, they make it to the Emerald City, where Dorothy is able to be sent home once again.

Sources
The Oz Encyclopedia at Piglet Press

Mr. Tinker in Oz
Oz (franchise) books
1985 fantasy novels
1985 children's books